Egbert "Eppie" Wietzes (28 May 1938 – 10 June 2020) was a racing driver from Canada.

Formula One
Wietzes was born in Assen, Netherlands in 1938, and emigrated with his family to Canada when he was 12 years old. He participated in two Formula One World Championship Grands Prix, debuting on 27 August 1967 in the inaugural Canadian Grand Prix at Mosport. He retired on lap 69 with wet electrics and was subsequently disqualified for receiving outside assistance. Wietzes also participated in the 1974 Canadian Grand Prix with a rented Brabham BT42 but again retired with a transmission problem. He scored no championship points. Wietzes later experienced success in the F5000 class and won the 1981 Trans-Am Series. In 1993, he was inducted into the Canadian Motorsport Hall of Fame.

Safety car
He was the driver of the first safety car in Formula One, in the 1973 Canadian Grand Prix, taking a Porsche 914 course car on to the track after a collision involving François Cevert and Jody Scheckter.

Complete Formula One World Championship results
(key)

References

External links

F1 Rejects profile

1938 births
2020 deaths
Canadian racing drivers
Canadian Formula One drivers
Dutch emigrants to Canada
People from Assen
Team Lotus Formula One drivers
Trans-Am Series drivers
Sportspeople from Drenthe